Harrogate Grammar School is a co-educational academy school and sixth form in Harrogate, North Yorkshire, England. It has around 1,900 pupils in the main school. A 2022 Ofsted inspection rated the school as 'Outstanding' in all five areas of the Ofsted framework

History
Harrogate Grammar School was founded in 1903 as the Municipal Secondary Day School of Harrogate. Its original premises were a collection of rented rooms in Haywra Crescent. By the time the school became a Grammar School in 1931 the original roll of 44 pupils had grown to 530, and the school had outgrown its premises. Work began on the new grammar school in Arthurs Avenue and the staff and pupils transferred in 1933.

Expansion

During the Second World War, many evacuees came to Harrogate from the cities, and the school's roll went up to 900 pupils. To keep pace with these numbers, the school undertook various periods of building expansion, most notably the 1970s addition of a sports hall and gymnasium, as well as music, reflexology and technology facilities.

Sixth Form
The school has undergone a period of growth in its Sixth Form and now has around 540 students on roll. The increased provision for Sixth Form began in the 1980s when a dedicated Sixth Form block was added.

The sixth form was further extended in 2013 as The Sherwood Wing, named after Mrs Jan Sherwood, a former Sixth Form Director, for her contribution to the school.

The school was named in July 2019 as a computing hub for the National Centre for Computing Education.

Specialist language status
In 2002 Harrogate Grammar School was given Specialist Language Status. In 2006 the school was recognised as a successful specialist school and was invited to take on a second specialism in technology.

Academy and National Teaching School status
In 2011, following the government's plans to turn high performing comprehensive schools in the UK into academies, the school was granted academy status. The school operated an independent academy trust until the formation of the Red Kite Learning Trust (RKLT) in late 2015. The RKLT formed as a multi-academy trust (MAT) with partner schools, including nearby primary schools and Prince Henry's Grammar School in Otley who had already been linked through the Red Kite Alliance (RKA), a group of schools through which teaching and learning development is shared.

The Learning Trust and Alliance is based at Harrogate Grammar School and they coordinate events, conferences, networking and School Centred Initial Teacher Training (SCITT) through Red Kite Teacher Training thanks to the status of Harrogate Grammar as a National Teaching School.

Staff
The current headteacher is Neil Renton who was appointed to the role in January 2019 to take over the post from former head Richard Sheriff in September 2019. Richard Sheriff had been head of the school since 2007, but is due to stay involved with the school closely in his role as CEO of the Red Kite Learning Trust of which Harrogate Grammar is a founding member.

Motto
The school shares its motto with the town of Harrogate. "Arx Celebris Fontibus" translated from Latin as, "A citadel famous for its springs".

House system
The school operates a House system, introduced in the 1950s. It was later ended but reinstated in 2001. The current houses are: Ventus, Ignis, Terra and Aqua, representing the four classical elements.

Bullying
In 1999, North Yorkshire County Council paid £6000 in an out-of-court settlement, "with no admission of liability" to a former pupil who stated that Harrogate Grammar School persistently failed to protect him from bullying. In 1999, the pupil and his mother founded the charity Bullying Online, now Bullying UK.

Air Training Corps
On 17 February 1939, No 58 (Harrogate) Squadron of the Air Defence Cadet Corps was established at the school by the Air League of the British Empire. The squadron has since moved to separate premises and is no longer associated with the school. Pupils from the school are still active cadets within the squadron.

Notable alumni

 Second Lieutenant Donald Bell VC, Army officer and professional footballer, awarded the Victoria Cross for his actions on the Somme in 1916.
Andrew Brons, British National Party (BNP) MEP for Yorkshire and the Humber
 Stuart Colman – Record producer who worked with Shakin Stevens 
 Jenny Duncalf – Professional squash player, having held Number 2 world ranking 
 Luke Garbutt – Current professional footballer for England national under-21 football team and Everton.
 Andrew Scarborough - Professional actor who has appeared in The Bill, Heartbeat and most notably starred in Downton Abbey. He and Hugo Speer also from the grammar school, starred together in the BBC comedy drama Hearts and Bones
 Hugo Speer- Professional actor who has appeared in The Bill, Heartbeat and most notably The Full Monty  
 Phil Swainston – England Youth International and professional Rugby Union player for Premiership team London Wasps and Harlequins 
 Martyn Wood – England international rugby union footballer.

References

External links
Official website

1903 establishments in England
Academies in North Yorkshire
Educational institutions established in 1903
Schools in Harrogate
Secondary schools in North Yorkshire